Kaku may refer to:

Kaku (name)
Kaku (TV channel), a  channel of Beijing TV
Kaku, Golestan, a village in Golestan Province, Iran
Kaku, Kurdistan (disambiguation), villages in Kurdistan Province, Iran
Kaku, Nepal
Kaku, Rõuge Parish, a village in Rõuge Parish, Võru County, Estonia
Kaku, Võru Parish, a village in Võru Parish, Võru County, Estonia
Käku, a village in Saare County, Estonia
Kaku (footballer), born Alejandro Romero Gamarra, Paraguayan footballer 
Michio Kaku populist scientist

Fictional characters
 Kaku (One Piece), a fictional character from Eiichirō Oda's manga One Piece
 Kaku the Tiger, a student of Charles Darwin Middle School from the cartoon My Gym Partner's a Monkey
 Kaku (king), an ancient king of Sumer
 Seiga Kaku, a character from Ten Desires